Trichembola palynata is a moth in the family Gelechiidae. It was described by Jean Ghesquière in 1940. It is found in the area of the former province Équateur in the Democratic Republic of the Congo.

References

Trichembola
Moths described in 1940
Endemic fauna of the Democratic Republic of the Congo